Dixie, West Virginia may refer to:
Dixie, Harrison County, West Virginia, an unincorporated community
Dixie, Nicholas County, West Virginia, a census-designated place (CDP) in Fayette and Nicholas counties